Libera Accademia di Belle Arti (Academy of Fine Arts), or LABA in short, is a Fine Arts University in Italy, with main campus in Brescia and branch campuses in Florence, Rimini and Torbole sul Garda. LABA offers undergraduate and postgraduate programs in the fields of art, new technologies, design, fashion, photography, film and theater, visual arts, architecture and interior design, scenography, graphic design, multimedia, cultural heritage, art therapy and arts administration. The university is accredited by Italian Ministry of Education, Universities and Research (MIUR).

Programmes
Undergraduate (Laurea)
- Scenography with a concentration in Drama and Performative Arts
- Scenography with a concentration in Cinema, Audiovisual and Multimedia
- Graphic Design and Multimedia Arts 
- Fashion Design 
- Design 
- New Art Technologies 
- Photography 
- Painting, Visual Art
- Interior Design (Decoration)

Postgraduate (Laurea Magistrale and Master 1st Level)
- Cinema & Audiovisual 
- Industrial and Research Design 
- Interior and Urban Design 
- Painting 
- Scenography 
- Photography 
- 3D Animation 
- Web & App Design
- Re-design Medicine
- Photography
- Accessory design
- Curatorship and Arts and Cultural Heritage Management
- Arts Therapies

Internationalisation
LABA has a campus in Douala in Cameroon. The university has collaborations with several universities and institutions in China and Vietnam.

References

External links
 LABA's Official Website
 LABA Florence Website
 LABA Rimini Website
 LABA Trentino Website

Art schools in Italy
Design schools in Italy
Graphic design schools
Higher education in Italy
Brescia